BSEB or bseb may refer to:

Bihar School Examination Board
Bihar State Electricity Board, former name of Bihar State Power Holding Company Limited